The CIK-FIA Karting Academy Trophy is an international kart racing competition organised by the FIA. Its inaugural season took place in 2010. Notable champions have been Formula One driver Charles Leclerc and F2 driver Richard Verschoor.

Champions

See also 

 Karting World Championship
 CIK-FIA Karting European Championship

References 

European auto racing series
Recurring sporting events established in 2010